Darío Javier Aimar Alvarez (born 5 January 1995) is an Ecuadorian footballer who plays as a defender for Ecuadorian Serie A side Barcelona SC and the Ecuador national team. He made his debut for Ecuador on 22 February 2017 in a match against Honduras.

Honors
Barcelona SC
Serie A (2): 2016, 2020

References

1995 births
Living people
Ecuadorian footballers
Ecuador international footballers
L.D.U. Loja footballers
Barcelona S.C. footballers
People from Quinindé Canton
Association football defenders